The 1981 PBA Open Conference Finals was the best-of-5 basketball championship series of the 1981 PBA Open Conference, and the conclusion of the conference's playoffs.

The Toyota Super Diesels defeated Crispa Redmanizers in a five-game series to win their seventh PBA title and finally ended frustrations of last season's three runner-up finishes. New Toyota coach Edgardo Ocampo won his first title with his new team and the second overall in his PBA coaching career. Toyota and Crispa played for the 10th and last time in a finals series.

Qualification

Games summary

Game 1

The Super Diesels led by as many as 16 points, 75–59. The fouling out of Jaworski, Fields and Tuadles gave the Redmanizers the chance to narrow the gap and then tie the score twice, the last at 112-all.

Toyota had to lean on the relief job of Victor King and the last-minute heroics and Danny Florencio and Ramon Fernandez to secure the hard-earned victory.

Game 2

Robert Jaworski missed a desperation three-point shot with one second left that could have won the game for the Super Diesels.

The Redmanizers led by 23 points late in the second quarter, 70–47, but fell behind, 100–104, in the fourth period. A see-saw battle had the lead change hands five times and the score tied three times, the last at 119-all.

Game 3

Crispa trailed, 106–114, with 4:06 remaining. The Redmanizers went on a scoring spree and held Toyota to a lone field goal by Abe King. The Super Diesels collapsed with four straight misses and three errors.

Game 4

Andrew Fields triggered Toyota’s blazing 13–1 windup with his four-point cluster that put the Super Diesels on top, 107–97, with 2:52 to go.

Game 5

The fifth and deciding game in the best-of-five title series had more than 25,000 fans at the big dome, the fitting climax had NBA referees Lee Jones and James Capers officiate the match. The game was close from start to finish and was deadlocked several times, it was tied for the last time at 97-all with 3:15 to go. After Ramon Fernandez scores to give Toyota a 99–97 lead, a Crispa turnover resulted to Atoy Co given a technical foul, Fernandez converted the technical free throw to make it 100–97 for the Super Diesels at the 2:00 mark. Another turnover by the Redmanizers, this time from an offensive foul from Co gives Toyota the ball possession. 

With 1:20 left, Andrew Fields scores with a foul from James Hardy. Fields sank his bonus shot for a three-point play, 103–97 for Toyota. On the next play, Bernie Fabiosa slips and lost the ball to Francis Arnaiz. Both teams had a series of misses in the final minute and with 20 seconds to go, Toyota freezes the ball to end the game in jubilation.

Rosters

Broadcast notes

References

1981
1981 PBA season
Toyota Super Corollas games
Crispa Redmanizers games
Crispa–Toyota rivalry
PBA Open Conference Finals